Eric Carlson (born 1963) is an American architect whose practice, Carbondale, is located in Paris, France. He is most recognized for his design, both interior and exterior, of the Louis Vuitton store located on the Champs-Élysées, Paris's 7th most visited destination.

Life and career
Carlson was born in Ann Arbor, Michigan. After receiving his diploma in architecture he moved to San Francisco to work with architects in America's "New Urbanism" movement. His architectural expertise was further refined upon his arrival to Europe, participating as a guest lecturer/critic at DSG Harvard University, the University of California, Tulane University and the Architectural Association School of Architecture in London. In 1997, Carlson co-founded the Louis Vuitton Architecture Department, establishing his own firm, Carbondale, in 2004, joined by Pierre Tortrat in 2006 and Pierre Marescaux in 2015.

A wide variety of projects designed by Carbondale, ranging from urban design, building architectural to interior architecture and furniture design, within settings throughout Europe, the Americas, Asia and Oceania. The office is said to be the first to bring architecture to luxury brands, notably with designs for the prominent Louis Vuitton building on the Champs Elysées in Paris, as well as boutiques for Dolce & Gabbana, Celine, TAG Heuer, Longchamp, H.Stern, Tiffany & Co. and Paspaley pearls. Recent creations include the Galaria Canalejas Interior in Madrid, the Dolce & Gabbana Palazzo Torres in Venice and the Iguatemi Plaza Atrium and Piselli Restaurant in Sao Paulo.

Principle designs
Dolce & Gabbana Rome, Italy 2019
Palazzo Dolce & Gabbana, Venice, Italy 2017 
Dolce & Gabbana Flagship Montecarlo, Monaco, 2017
Île Saint-Louis Residence, Paris, France, 2017
Longchamp Paris Maison, Paris France, 2016
Piselli Sud, São Paulo, Brazil, 2015
Iguatemi Public Plaza, São Paulo, Brazil, 2015
Iguatemi Skylight, São Paulo, Brazil, 2015
BMW Manhattan Showroom, New York, USA, 2014
Longchamp, New Bond Street, London, Great Britain, 2014
Paspaley Pearls, Brisbane, Australia, 2014
Paspaley Pearls, Melbourne, Australia, 2013
BMW Parklane Showroom, London, UK, 2013
H Stern Flagship, Seoul, South Korea, 2013 
Tre Bicchieri, São Paulo, Brazil, 2012
JK Iguatemi Shopping Center, São Paulo, Brazil, 2012 
Longchamp Maison, Canton Road, Kowloon, China, 2012
H Stern Takashimaya, Shanghai, China, 2012 
BMW Brand Store, Paris, 2012
Tag Heuer Flagship Store, Las Vegas, US, 2011
Longchamp Flagship Store, Madison Avenue New York, Düsseldorf, Knokke, 2009–2010
Escada Headquarters, Munich, Germany, 2008	
Apartment "Stretch", Paris, France, 2008
Tag Heuer Flagship Store, London, Great Britain, 2008
Tag Heuer Headquarters, La Chaux De Fonds, Switzerland, 2007
Tiffany Façade, Tokyo, Japan, 2007
Museum 360°, La Chaux De Fonds, Switzerland, 2007
Penthouse Apartments, Aoyama, Tokyo, Japan, 2006
Riverain Commercial Center, Fukuoka, Japan, 2006
Marina Luxury Lofts, Ibiza, Espagne, 2005
Public Plaza and Commercial, Office & Residential spaces, Abu Dhabi, Uae, 2005
Plaza Ecija, Ecija (Sevilla), Spain, 2005
Takashimaya Department Store, Shinjuku, Tokyo, Japan, 2005
Louis Vuitton Maison, Champs Elysees, Paris, France, 2005 
Céline, Avenue Montaigne, Paris, France, 2004
Louis Vuitton, Nagoya, Roppongi Hills Tokyo, Ginza Tokyo, Omotesando Tokyo, LV Building, Seoul, 2002–2007
Club Celux, Tokyo, Japan, 2003

Awards and honours
UNESCO's Prix Versailles "Best Retail Interior Design, Worldwide", Palazzo Dolce & Gabbana Venice; 2018
UNESCO's Prix Versailles "Best Retail Interior Design, Europe", Palazzo Dolce & Gabbana Venice; 2018
"Best Designers of 2013", Tre Bicchierie Restaurant - São Paulo, Architecture Digest Collector Series; 2013
"Australian Made Award", ASOFIA, Paspaley Melbourne Flagship store, Australia; 2013
"Best International Project", Lighting Design Awards, BMW Showroom, Paris; 2013
"Asia's Top 10 Best Retail Interior Design Projects", La Maison Longchamp, Hong Kong, Perspective magazine's; 2013
"Interior of the Year 2013" Victoria Australia, ASOFIA, Paspaley Melbourne Flagship store; 2013
"Best Designers of 2010", Aoyama Residence, Tokyo, Architecture Digest (AD), 2010
"The Award for Rarity" for achievements in Luxury Design and Architecture from the Centre du Luxe et de la Creation, Paris; 2010
"The Most Beautiful Creation in Metal" for the Interior design of the Louis Vuitton Champs Elysees Building, from the French Metallic Construction Institute; 2006
"The Outstanding Design Award" from the Seoul Metropolitan Government for the design of the Cheongdam-Dong building, Seoul, South Korea; 2001

Exhibitions
Architecture Furniture, 1960-2020. Cité de L'Architecture & du Patrimoine. Exhibition, Paris; 2019
"DG Evolution", Design Week Milan; 2017
"10 Furniture Projects", Exhibition, Paris; 2010
"Inclusive", Exhibition at Aedes Gallery, Berlin & Milk Gallery, New York; 2004
"Logique / Visuelle", Exhibition, Omotesando, Tokyo; 2003

External links

References

21st-century American architects
Living people
1963 births
People from Ann Arbor, Michigan